Presbyterian Church of Norwood is a historic church at 701 Broadway in Norwood, Bergen County, New Jersey, United States. The church was built in 1868 and added to the National Register of Historic Places on February 1, 2006.

See also 
 National Register of Historic Places listings in Bergen County, New Jersey

References

External links
 View of Presbyterian Church of Norwood via Google Street View

Churches on the National Register of Historic Places in New Jersey
Stick style architecture in New Jersey
Churches completed in 1868
19th-century Presbyterian church buildings in the United States
Churches in Bergen County, New Jersey
Presbyterian churches in New Jersey
National Register of Historic Places in Bergen County, New Jersey
Norwood, New Jersey
New Jersey Register of Historic Places